Grantville is a city in Coweta County, Georgia, United States. The 2010 census shows a population of 3,041.

Geography

Grantville is located along the southern border of Coweta County at  (33.237252, -84.827059). U.S. Route 29 runs through the city, passing south of the center, while Interstate 85 passes through the eastern part of the city, crossing US 29 at Exit 35. I-85 leads northeast  to Atlanta and southwest  to Montgomery, Alabama, while US 29, a more local road, leads north  to Newnan, the Coweta County seat, and southwest  to LaGrange.

Demographics

2020 census

As of the 2020 United States census, there were 3,103 people, 1,046 households, and 841 families residing in the city.

2000 census
As of the census of 2000, there were 1,309 people, 516 households, and 359 families residing in the city. The racial makeup of the city was 69.29% White, 28.50% African American, 0.31% Native American, 0.53% Asian, 1.15% from other races, and 0.23% from two or more races. Hispanic or Latino of any race were 1.45% of the population.

There were 516 households, out of which 32.2% had children under the age of 18 living with them, 47.7% were married couples living together, 17.2% had a female householder with no husband present, and 30.4% were non-families. 26.6% of all households were made up of individuals, and 9.5% had someone living alone who was 65 years of age or older.  The average household size was 2.54 and the average family size was 3.03.

In the city, the population was spread out, with 27.0% under the age of 18, 8.5% from 18 to 24, 30.2% from 25 to 44, 23.4% from 45 to 64, and 11.0% who were 65 years of age or older.  The median age was 34 years. For every 100 females, there were 88.9 males.  For every 100 females age 18 and over, there were 85.6 males.

The median income for a household in the city was $28,929, and the median income for a family was $33,594. Males had a median income of $28,929 versus $23,250 for females. The per capita income for the city was $13,982.  About 10.1% of families and 13.4% of the population were below the poverty line, including 11.3% of those under age 18 and 23.7% of those age 65 or over.

Notable events

A number of episodes of the AMC series The Walking Dead were shot in the town. Since the shooting of the series tourism to the town has increased greatly, making it an important industry to the town. Grantville was chosen as a location in The Walking Dead because of the number of faded and dilapidated buildings that give parts of the town a "post-apocalyptic" feeling, a result of the decline in the cotton industry in the area.

The movies Lawless and Broken Bridges were also shot in Grantville. Recently, nine buildings in downtown were listed for sale on eBay.

References

External links
City of Grantville official website

Cities in Georgia (U.S. state)
Cities in Coweta County, Georgia